Katrin Klujber (born 21 April 1999) is a Hungarian handballer for Ferencvárosi TC and the Hungarian national team.

In September 2018, she was included by EHF in a list of the twenty best young handballers to watch for the future.

She made her international debut on 24 March 2019 against Japan. Since then she represented Hungary at two European Championship (2020, 2022), and two World Championship (2019, 2021) tournaments. She also participated in the Tokyo Summer Olympics in 2020, where the team finished 7th.

Achievements
National team
IHF Women's Junior World Championship: 
Winner: 2018
Youth European Championship: 
Bronze Medalist: 2015
European Competition
EHF Cup:
Winner: 2016
Domestic Competition
Nemzeti Bajnokság:
Winner: 2021

Awards and recognition
 Hungarian Handballer of the Year: 2022
 Youth Handball Player of the Year in Hungary: 2016
 All-Star Right Back of the European Championship: 2022
 All-Star Right Wing of the EHF European Junior Championship: 2017
 EHF Female Player of the Month: February 2019, October 2019
 Handball-Planet.com All-Star Young Right Back of the year: 2019/2020
 Handball-planet Young World Female Handball Player: 2019–2020

References

External links

1999 births
Living people
Sportspeople from Dunaújváros 
Hungarian female handball players
Ferencvárosi TC players (women's handball)
Handball players at the 2020 Summer Olympics